Tristan Daniel Borges (born 26 August 1998) is a Canadian professional soccer player who plays as a midfielder for Canadian club Forge FC.

Early life
Borges began playing youth soccer with Vaughan SC, later moving on to Kleinburg-Nobleton SC followed by West Toronto SC. In 2015, he joined the Toronto FC Academy. He is of Portuguese descent and holds a European passport.

Playing career

Semi-professional and U21
In 2015, he played in League1 Ontario with Toronto FC III. He scored his first goal on July 4 against ANB Futbol. Over the course of the season, he scored six goals.

From early 2016 until summer 2018, Borges was a member of the youth academy of Dutch Eredivisie club SC Heerenveen where he played for the U21 team.

After leaving Heerenveen in summer 2018, Borges returned to Canada and signed with League1 Ontario side Sigma FC in September of that year.

Professional
On 10 January 2019, Borges signed his first professional contract with Canadian Premier League side Forge FC. He made his debut in the inaugural CPL match against York9 FC on 27 April 2019. 
He scored the winning goal in the first leg of the CPL Finals, before being sent off. Forge appealed the red card to the Canadian Soccer Association and it was rescinded, allowing Borges to play in the second leg, which also ended in a 1–0 victory. Borges was a standout in the CPL's inaugural season, winning the Golden Boot, with 13 goals, and sharing in a six-way tie for most assists, with five. In November 2019, Borges was announced as both the CPL Player of the Year and best Canadian U-21 player.

On 22 January 2020, Borges was transferred to Belgian First Division B side Oud-Heverlee Leuven for a fee reported to be "between $300,000 and $500,000", signing a contract until summer 2022. He made his debut on February 1 against Roeselare.

On 5 March 2021, after receiving limited playing time for OH Leuven, Borges was loaned back to Forge FC for the 2021 Canadian Premier League season. His loan was later extended in February 2022. Upon the expiry of his contract with Leuven and thus his Forge loan, he remained with Forge for the remainder of the season.

International career

Youth
Borges received his first Canadian youth national team call-up in August 2014 for an under-17 friendly tournament in Mexico. He participated in several other under-17 camps in the fall and winter of 2014–15 and was subsequently called up for the 2015 CONCACAF U-17 Championship. Borges made six appearances in the tournament and scored Canada's lone goal in a 1–1 draw against Mexico.

Beginning in September 2015, Borges participated in several under-20 team camps in the lead-up to the 2017 CONCACAF U-20 Championship. At that tournament, he made three appearances for Canada and assisted on a goal in a 2–0 win over Antigua and Barbuda.

In January 2018, Borges was called up for a Canadian under-23 camp in the United States. In February 2020, Borges was named to the Canadian U-23 provisional roster for the 2020 CONCACAF Men's Olympic Qualifying Championship.

Senior
In January 2020, Borges was called up to the Canadian senior team ahead of friendlies against Barbados and Iceland. He made his debut as a substitute on 10 January against Barbados.

Career statistics

Honours
Forge FC
Canadian Premier League: 2019

Individual
Canadian Premier League Golden Boot: 2019
Canadian Premier League Player of the Year: 2019
Canadian Premier League Best U21 Canadian Player of the Year: 2019

References

External links
 
 

1998 births
Living people
Association football midfielders
Canadian soccer players
Soccer players from Toronto
Canadian people of Portuguese descent
Canadian expatriate soccer players
Expatriate footballers in the Netherlands
Canadian expatriate sportspeople in the Netherlands
Expatriate footballers in Belgium
Canadian expatriate sportspeople in Belgium
Toronto FC players
SC Heerenveen players
Forge FC players
Oud-Heverlee Leuven players
League1 Ontario players
Canadian Premier League players
Challenger Pro League players
Canada men's youth international soccer players
Canada men's international soccer players
Sigma FC players
Vaughan Azzurri players